M Abdur Rahim Medical College, Dinajpur (MARMC) is a public medical school in Bangladesh, established in 1992. It is located in the Dinajpur District of Rangpur Division. It is affiliated with Rajshahi Medical University. It was renamed from Dinajpur Medical College and Hospital to M Abdur Rahim Medical College and Hospital after M. Abdur Rahim.

Campus

Mosque
It is two storied building, situated at the south-west corner of the MARMC Playground.

Hostels
The name of the boys hostel is Dr. Md. Yousuf Ali Hall. It includes two four-storied buildings beside the play ground.

The name of the girls hostel is Dr. Md. Taibur Rahman Hall. It includes three four-storied building. It has three blocks. Eastern block, Western block and Main hostel.

There are two four-storied building for intern doctors. One for boys and one for girls. They are well decorated and behind the hospital for 24-hour medical service. There are two hostels for trainee nurses, near the nursing institute. There are also number of quarters for teachers, doctors, nurses and guest house for guests.

Dinajpur Nursing College

There is a well-developed nursing college affiliated with the hospital. It provides training for young nurses. There are also hostels for nurses near the hospital.

Other institutions under its affiliation

 Dinajpur 250-bed general Hospital
 Zia Heart Foundation Hospital
 Diabetic Hospital
 BNSB Eye Hospital
 MCHC Center
 School Health Center
 Center For Nuclear medicine, Dinajpur
 Chest Disease Clinic
 Leprosy Clinic

Administration
The principal is Dr. Syed Nadir Hossain (Associate Professor and Head of the Orthopedics department).

Phase coordinators
1st Phase: Dr. Nurul Islam (Head of the Biochemistry department)
2nd Phase: Dr. Upal Caesar (Head of the Community medicine department)
3rd Phase: Prof. Dr. Jogendranath Sarkar (Head of the Microbiology department)
4th Phase: Prof. Dr. Saki Muhammad Zakiul Alam (Head of the Medicine department)

Academics

M Abdur Rahim Medical College admits 180 students into the MBBS degree programme yearly under the government medical admission test. M Abdur Rahim Medical College is under DGHS and curriculum by Bangladesh Medical and Dental Council (BMDC). The admission test is conducted centrally under Directorate General of Health Services. M Abdur Rahim Medical College admits a good number of postgraduate students on different postgraduate courses offering by the college under BSMMU. M Abdur Rahim Medical College is affiliated with BSMMU and Bangladesh College of Physicians and Surgeons. For foreign students, admission is through the Embassy of Bangladesh in respective countries. Many students from Pakistan, Nepal, Bhutan are Studying here. It is good achievement of M Abdur Rahim Medical College. 25 batches have passed from this medical college successfully.

Courses
M Abdur Rahim Medical College offers both undergraduate and postgraduate degrees.

MARMC Journal
M Abdur Rahim Medical College Journal (MARMCJ) is BMDC recognised journal, published twice a year. It accepts original papers, review articles, case reports and short communications related to various disciplines of medical science for publication. Paper should be solely contributed to the journal.

Published Journals:
MARMCJ

Recognition
The degree is recognised by the Bangladesh Medical and Dental Council. Graduates of the medical college are eligible for USMLE and PLAB examination. M Abdur Rahim Medical College is listed in the IMED.

Clubs and other activities
 Sandhani (MARMC unit)
 Medicine Club (MARMC unit)
 Oikotan (cultural organisation of MARMC)

See also
 List of medical colleges in Bangladesh

References

Medical colleges in Bangladesh
Hospitals in Bangladesh
Educational institutions established in 1992
1992 establishments in Bangladesh